Al Ahly Sporting Club, commonly referred to as Ahly, is an Egyptian professional football club based in Cairo. The club plays in the Egyptian Premier League. 

Founded on 24 April 1907 as a gathering place for Cairo's Student Unions, Al Ahly has a record of 42 Egyptian Premier League titles, 37 Egypt Cup titles and 12 Egyptian Super Cups. Al Ahly is the most successful club in Africa.

In international competitions, the club has won a record 10 CAF Champions League titles, 1 CAF Confederation Cup, a record of 8 CAF Super Cups, a record of 4 African Cup Winners' Cups, 1 Afro-Asian Club Championship, an Arab Club Champions Cup, an Arab Cup Winners' Cup, a record of 2 Arab Super Cups, and has won 3 bronze medals in the FIFA Club World Cup. With 24 continental titles, Al Ahly is the most successful football club in Africa, and was voted by CAF as the African club of the 20th century.

History

Establishment and start of the club 

The idea of establishing Al Ahly in the first 10 years of the 20th century was raised by Omar Lotfy who was a student in the Egyptian Law School during his presidency of the High School Students Club, which was established in 1905. The establishment of a club of high school students was for political reasons, and the students needed a sports club to gather them for leisure and exercise.

He discussed the idea of establishing the club with a group of friends who were enthusiastic about it, and in 1907 Al Ahly was established.

The club was first headed by Alfred Mitchell-Innes, who was a British advisor to the Ministry of Finance at the time, in order to facilitate financial support for the club. An official meeting of the club's board was held on 24 April 1907. The committee met at 5:30 pm in the house of Mitchell-Innes in Giza under his chairmanship and the membership of Idris Ragheb Bey, Ismael Seri Pasha, Amin Sami Pasha, Omar Lotfi Bek and Mohamed Effendi Sherif as secretary.

The establishment of the club was approved and architect Ismail Seri designed the main building of the club, which was revised by Mitchell-Innes to place the building in the south-eastern corner of the land, so that the building main entrance would face north. A civil company on behalf of Al Ahly Sports Club was established. Shares of the company were worth £E5 each, and it was the goal of the club when it was established to raise £E5,000. Only £E3,165 were collected over a year, which was not enough.  This forced the club to borrow £E1,000 from the National Bank of Egypt in March 1908 by Omar Sultan and Idris Ragheb and Talaat Harb contributed £E100 to the establishment of the club.

The first honorary president of the club was the Minister of Education Saad Zaghloul. The name of Al Ahly Sporting Club was suggested by Amine Samy Amin, to serve the students and graduates of high schools who were the mainstay of the revolution against the British occupation. On 2 April 1908, Mitchell-Innes stepped down as president of the club. Aziz Ezzat was appointed as the new president and became the first Egyptian president of Al Ahly. The official opening ceremony of the club was held in its main building on 26 February 1908.

The game of football was not one of the goals of the founders of Al Ahly club, but rather to open its doors to students of higher schools to meet and practice political dialogues.  However, the graduates of high schools who were members of the club fell in love with football, which prompted Ahly to build the first stadium in 1909. They used to call it at the time (Al-Hawsh); a colloquial word from the Egyptian dialect, meaning the courtyard in Arabic. The stadium was developed over the years to become Mokhtar El-Tetsh Stadium.

The first official football team was established in 1911. The team was primary and secondary school players who played the ball in Al-Hawash, which was established in 1909 in the club's land. The names of the first players of Al Ahly were as follows: Hussain Higazi, Abdel Fattah Taher, Fouad Darwish, Hussein Mansour, and Ibrahim Fahmy. The star of this team was the striker Hussein Hegazi.

In 1915, Al Ahly made tours of Egyptian cities to play matches and to spread football and its culture. Al Ahly played in Alexandria, Port Said, Assiut, and Ismailia. The team, led by the star Hussein Hegazy, faced many teams, including foreign teams belonging to the British army, which increased the popularity of Al Ahly and the new game in Egypt.
Ahly contributed with Zamalek SC, El Sekka El Hadid SC in the formation of the first football team of Egypt to participate in the Olympic games 1920. The club also contributed to the establishment of the Egyptian Football Association. In 1923, Al Ahly played an active role in the establishment of the Egyptian Tennis Federation.

First Titles (1918–1948)
After Al Ahly's refusal to compete with foreign Allied clubs in the Sultan Hussein Cup in its first edition in 1917, the club's management decided to participate in the 1918 championship.
In 1923, Al-Ahly won the Sultan Hussain Cup after beating the defending champion Zamalek, then added six other titles to be the record holder in the number of wins until the last edition in 1938.

The club followed winning the Sultan Hussain Cup with the King Farouk Cup in 1924 for the first time, defeating El Sekka El Hadid 4–1 in the final.
The man of the match was Mokhtar Eltetsh, who scored two goals.

In the summer of 1929, Al Ahly's football team made a tour, the first of its kind where the team traveled to face several European clubs, such as Fenerbahçe and Galatasaray in Turkey and BFC Preussen, 1860 Munich and Schalke in Germany. The tour ended with Al Ahly playing the last two games in Bulgaria against Levski Sofia and Slavia Sofia.

In November 1930, Al-Ahly defeated traditional rival Zamalek 4–0 in a match in the Cairo League. In that game, Mokhtar El Tetsh was the first player to score a hat trick in the Cairo Derby. At the end of the 1936–1937 season, Al Ahly managed to win the league in the last round by defeating Zamalek 4–1, finishing three points ahead of their rivals. The club achieved the double by winning the King Farouk Cup with a 3–2 Victory over El Sekka El Hadid SC, in a match where Abdel Karim Saqr scored the winning goal in the last minutes.

Inaugurated in 1917, Al Ahly won the last version of the Sultan Hussein Cup held in 1938, with a difficult 1–0 victory over Al Masry in the final match, as Mustafa Latif scored the winning goal in the first half of extra time. The club won the Cairo League, again in the last round, with a large 5–1 victory over the second placed Zamalek, with Saleh Al Sawwaf scoring two goals, and Mokhtar El-Tetsh, Jamil Saber and Abdel-Majid El-Ashry scoring one goal each.

The team traveled to Mandatory Palestine in 1943 on a 23-day tour, headed by club legend Mokhtar El Tetsh, to play several matches with Arab teams to support Palestine against the Zionists.
The decision came, despite the refusal of the president of the Egyptian Football Association Haider Pasha due to the pressure from the British, due to their known position against the Palestinian issue.

Dominating the league (1948–1967)

In the first edition of the Egyptian Premier League, held for the first time in 1948, Al Ahly won the first match 5–0 against Greek Alexandria. Ahmed Makkawi scored the first goal for Al Ahly in the history of the competition in the 11th minute.
Mekkawi added a second goal in the second half, and Helmy Abu El-Maaty, Mohamed Lahita and Fathi Khattab each scored one goal.
The first team to represent Al Ahly in the competition was composed of: Kamal Hamed – Abdulaziz Hamami – Muhammad Abu Habajah – Abdel Moneim Shatara – Sayed Othman – Hilmi Abu Al-Moaty – Fouad Sedki – Muhammad Lheta – Ahmed Mekkawi – Saleh Selim – Fathi Khattab.
Mokhatr al Tetsh led Al Ahly to win the first championship in the club's history as a player and also led the club to win the first league in the club's history as a manager, achieving a double of the league and the cup for the first time after defeating Zamalek 3–1 in the 1949 King Farouk Cup final. Toto, Hussein Madkour and Fathi Khattab scored for Al Ahly.

The 1949–50 season witnessed a historical superiority for Al Ahly by the Golden Fifties Generation, led by Saleh Selim, Toto and Ahmed Mekkawi, winning all the local championships. Al Ahly won the Egyptian Premier League after a strong competition with Tersana ended with the two teams tying in points. The league winner was decided by a play-off match; Al Ahly clinched the league after defeating Tersana 2–1 in the play-off. Goals were scored by Toto and Fathi Khattab. The club also won the Cairo League, one point ahead of Tersana. In the Egypt Cup, Al Ahly Defeated Tersana in the final by a big score 6–0.

In the 1950–51 season, Al Ahly won the double, by winning the league for the third consecutive time despite the strong competition with Zamalek, as well as a difficult victory in the King Farouk Cup final against El Sekka El Hadid. Following the dethroning of King Farouk in the 1952 revolution, Ahly appointed Gamal Abdel Nasser as club honorary president.

In the 1951–52 season, the league championship was cancelled due to the 1952 revolution, and to allow the national team to prepare for the 1952 Summer Olympics. However, the Egypt Cup and the Cairo League were played normally. Al Ahly lost both tournaments to Zamalek. The competition returned the following season and Al Ahly managed to win it for the fourth time in a row, with a narrow two points ahead of Zamalek, after the two teams tied 2–2 in the last round. In the cup, Al Ahly managed to defeat the defending champions Zamalek 4–1 in the final, in a match where Saleh Selim scored two goals and his older brother Abdel-Wahab Selim scored a goal.

In the 1956–57 season, the number of teams increased to 14 teams, and Al Ahly managed to win the league nine points ahead from Zamalek the runner-up, to win the seventh title in a row. It was the first time that the team had reached 40 points.

Al Ahly won the 1958–59 league championship for the ninth time in a row. El-Sayed El-Dhizui became the first Al Ahly player to be the top goal scorer in the league. The team scored 55 goals in just 18 games that season, more than 20 goals from their nearest competitors.

After losing the league for the first time since the start of the competition, Al Ahly won the league for the tenth time in the club's history, in the 1960–61 season.
The club won the Egypt Cup after defeating El Qanah 5–0, with Mimi El-Sherbini scoring two goals.

First participation in African championships (1967–1980)
After the 1967 Six-Day War and the suspension of sporting activity in Egypt, Al Ahly's board headed by Ibrahim Kamel El-Wakil announced that the club will host the military training for the members volunteering in the Egyptian Army, as well as collecting donations in the name of the club to support the military.

An entire generation of football stars retired because of the war, like: Saleh Selim, Tariq Salim, Taha Ismail, Rifaat El-Fanagily, Adel Haikal and Mahmoud El-Gohary. Al-Ahly did not win the league for another 13 years.

After years of deterioration, the club took the first steps in recovery when the management decided to sign Nándor Hidegkuti as head coach in September 1973, at a salary of fewer than 600 dollars. Hidegkuti introduced a new generation known as El Talamza (the students). The league title returned to Al Ahly in 1974–75, with the team scoring 70 goals in 34 games. Al Ahly's first participation in the African Champions League was in 1976. An unsuccessful start, the team got knocked out from the first round by MC Alger. Al Khatib scored the first continental goal for Al Ahly.

The club won the league in 1975–76 and 1976–77. The latter season saw the second participation in African competition, where the team fared better than the first time. They eventually bowed out in the quarter-finals by Accra Hearts of Oak S.C. From 1978 to 1980, Hidegkuti refused to take part in the CAF Champions League due to lack of financial resources and exhausting journeys in Africa.

Invading Africa (1980–1990) 
Zamalek remained ahead of Al Ahly by six points in the 1981–82 Egyptian Premier League season. That season, a match won was counted in two points, not three. Last matches in the competition witnessed a dip in form by Zamalek until Al Ahly managed to win the championship with three points ahead of them, after a goalless Cairo derby draw in the last round. Al Ahly reached the semi-final of 1981 African Cup of Champions Clubs but withdrew because of the assassination of the President Anwar Sadat.

Al Ahly won the 1982 African Cup of Champions Clubs, known today as the CAF Champions League, defeating Asante Kotoko S.C. in the final. They won the first leg 3–0. Mahmoud El Khatib scored two goals, and Alaa Mayhoub scored one. The first leg was held on 28 November at the Cairo Stadium in front of 60,000 spectators. In the second leg, in Kumasi, Mahmoud El Khatib returned to score again and the game ended 1–1. The second leg was held on 12 December in Kumasi, Ghana, and was attended by more than 70,000 spectators. Al Ahly during this edition of the tournament played ten games, achieved victory in all five games at home, lost two games and tied in three away. The biggest result was a 5–0 victory against Young Africans S.C. in the round of 16. The club scored 16 goals and conceded five goals only in this tournament. After 15 years, Al Ahly finally won their first continental championship.

Al Ahly reached the final of the African Champions League for the second time in a row in 1983, but rivals Kotoko managed to avenge their defeat by scoring the only goal in both matches. The first leg was played on 27 November at Cairo Stadium in the presence of 90,000 spectators, attended by the former President Hosni Mubarak, and ended 0–0. The second leg took place on 11 December in Kumasi in the presence of 70,000 spectators, ended with 1–0 win scored by Opoku Nti in the 22nd minute. The goal of the match was from a clear offside.

Al Ahly reached a continental final again in 1984, this time in the African Cup Winners' Cup against Canon Yaoundé. Al-Ahly won on penalties in the Cameroonian capital after a 1–1 draw in both games. The 1984–85 season was one of the best seasons in the history of Al Ahly, as the Red Giants won the cup and the league, as well as winning the African Cup Winners Cup for the second time in a row by defeating Leventis United 2–1 on aggregate. For the third time in a row, Al Ahly won the African Cup Winners' Cup in 1986 after winning the league, by defeating AS Sogara in the final 3–2 on aggregate, with Taher Abouzeid scoring two goals and Magdi Abdel Ghani scoring once.

Al Ahly won the Egyptian League in the 1986–87 season under the management of the coach Taha Ismail. The competition with Zamalek continued until the last round, when Al Ahly was two points ahead. The club was able to beat Zamalek in the last round 2–1 with two goals scored by Ayman Shawky.

Al Ahly won the 1987 African Cup of Champions Clubs by defeating Al-Hilal Club in the final. The first leg was a 0–0 draw played on 29 November in the Sudanese capital Khartoum, attended by 50,000 Sudanese and 500 Egyptian spectators. The second leg was held on 18 December at the Cairo Stadium in the presence of 80,000 spectators, and ended 2–0 for Al Ahly. Jamal Thaalab scored an own goal and Ayman Shawky scored the second goal. Three days after the match, club legend Mahmoud El Khatib decided to retire after 17 years at the club, in a press conference attended by a large crowd of journalists.

Arab Tournaments Glory & Boycotting CAF (1990–2005)
Al Ahly won the Egypt Cup title in 1992 by defeating the league champions Zamalek 2–1 in an exciting final. Ayman Shawky scored the winning goal in the 92nd minute with a header. After winning the cup for the third time in a row in 1993, Al Ahly returned to Africa by winning the African Cup Winners' Cup for the fourth time in its history in 1993, which was the last participation of the club in this tournament. Al Ahly defeated Africa Sports d'Abidjan in the final with a penalty scored by Adel Abdelrahman in Cairo Stadium after a 1–1 draw in the first leg. In the same season, the club won the Egypt Cup by beating Ghazl El Mahalla SC 3–2 in the final.

After three years without winning the league, the title returned to Al Ahly in the 1993–94 season under the management of Alan Harris after a strong competition with Ismaily SC, which was only decided by a playoff match in which the Red Giants won 4–3 in Alexandria with a hat-trick scored by Mohamed Ramadan.

Al Ahly participated in the Arab Championships for the first time in 1994 after a decision to boycott the African tournaments due to weak financial returns and complaints about the refereeing decisions in the 1994 CAF Super Cup. Al Ahly won the 1994 Arab Cup Winners' Cup by defeating Al Shabab in the final 1–0 with a goal scored by Felix Aboagye. After leading Al Ahly to their second consecutive league title and the Arab Super Cup in Morocco, Reiner Hollmann left Al Ahly at the end of 1997, after finishing second in the 1997 Arab Club Champions Cup in Tunisia. He was replaced by his countryman Rainer Zobel, who succeeded in winning the league championship for the fifth consecutive season in 1997–98 and winning the 1998 Arab Super Cup title with Zobel for the second successive season, beating MC Oran and Al-Shabab, and drawing with Club Africain.
In 1998, Al Ahly returned to the African championships for the first time in six years.

In the summer of 2001, Ahly signed Manuel José to take on the leadership of the team, the first time in the club's history to have a Portuguese manager. Jose's first acquaintance with Al Ahly was a friendly match against Real Madrid in August 2001, when Al Ahly stunned Madrid with a 1–0 win with a goal by Sunday Chibuike at the Cairo Stadium. The goal came after Khaled Bebo embarked on a counter-attacking solo run before passing to Hossam Ghaly who beat the Real goalkeeper and passed it to Sunday who shoot it into the empty net.
This was the fourth time Al Ahly had defeated a European champion, the others being a 3–2 victory over Benfica in 1963 who had won the European Cup in 1961 and 1962 and reached the final in 1963, a 2–1 win against Bayern Munich in 1977, and finally, defeating Steaua București 3–0 in 1986.

Al Ahly won the African Champions League title after a 4–1 victory over Mamelodi Sundowns F.C. The first leg was held on 8 December at the Loftus Versfeld Stadium in the South African capital Pretoria, and ended in a 1–1 draw. Gift Kampamba scored in the 26th minute, and Sayed Abdel Hafeez equalized in the 58th minute. The second leg was held on 21 December at the Cairo International Stadium in the presence of 75,000 spectators, and ended with a victory for Al Ahly with three goals scored by Khaled Bebo.

Al Ahly also confirmed their continental supremacy by grabbing the Super Cup with a victory over yet another South African team. This time defeating Kaizer Chiefs F.C. 4–1 in Cairo, in a match that saw Al Ahly's goalkeeper Essam El Hadary scoring his historic goal. Manuel Jose was unable to collect any local championships in his first term, although his team was able to achieve an emphatic 6–1 victory against the defending champion Zamalek in the league, with Khaled Bebo scoring four goals. It is the first and only time in the history of the Cairo derby that any player had achieved that feat. At the end of the season, Jose was sacked and replaced by the Dutchman Johannes Bonfrere on a one-year contract, on a monthly salary of $18,000. The club's decision to sack Jose was not welcomed by the majority of the fans.

Golden Era (2005–2013)

2005: Undefeated Season 
Al Ahly achieved victory in all the matches of the first 14 rounds of the 2004–05 Egyptian Premier League, to win the Premier League title for the 29th time in the club history and the first local championship for the Portuguese coach Manuel José who was rehired by the club. Al Ahly won the league by a record 31 point difference from Enppi, the closest competitor. It was the first time that a club won all their matches in the first half of a season since the league began in 1948.

Al Ahly also won their second Egyptian Super Cup in July 2005 by defeating Enppi 1–0, with a goal scored in extra time by Wael Gomaa. At the end of 2005, the club clinched the CAF Champions League for the fourth time in their history after defeating Étoile du Sahel 3–0 in the final in Cairo. The first leg was played on 29 October at the Stade Olympique de Sousse, Tunisia, and ended 0–0. The second leg was played on 12 November at the Cairo Military Academy Stadium in the presence of 30,000 spectators, due to renovations at Cairo International Stadium in preparation for hosting the 2006 African Nations Cup. Al Ahly won 3–0, with goals scored by Mohamed Aboutrika, Osama Hosni, and Mohammed Barakat.

With their Champions League triumph, the team would go on to set an unprecedented record of going an entire season unbeaten in all competitions. 46 matches were played in the Egyptian Premier League, Egypt Cup, Egyptian Super Cup, and the CAF Champions League combined, with the club completing a quadruple winning all the aforementioned competitions. The club also set another record of not losing in 52 games in 852 days. Al Ahly then made their first appearance at a FIFA Club World Cup in December 2005, but had an unsuccessful campaign as the team lost to Al-Ittihad in the first round and then lost the fifth-place to Sydney FC.

Many believe that 2006–07 season is the best season in the history of Al Ahly in terms of achievements, starting with the Egyptian Super Cup for the second time with another win over Enppi, with a goal in the stoppage time. The club also won the league for the second time in a row. Al Ahly then returned to the Egyptian Cup with a 3–0 win over Zamalek SC, achieving a domestic treble.

Al Ahly dominated Africa again by reaching the final against CS Sfaxien, drawing the first leg 1–1 in the Cairo Stadium, with goals scored by Abu Trika in the first half from a direct free kick, and then an equalizer from Frimpong for Sfaxien, five minutes in the second half. CS Sfaxien were the favorites to win the cup for the first time in their history. In the last seconds of the second leg, however, the result was 0–0 until Mohamed Aboutrika scored the only goal of the match on the volley, to clinch the title for Al Ahly.

The club then participated in the 2006 FIFA Club World Cup for the second time in a row, in the championship held in Japan. Al Ahly's participation this time was a progress to the previous one, as they defeated Auckland City FC in the quarter-final 2–0 with two goals scored by Flávio Amado and Mohamed Aboutrika in the second half. The team qualified for the semi-finals to face Brazilian club Internacional, losing 2–1 by goals from Alexandre Pato and Luiz Adriano, while Flavio scored for Al Ahly in the second half. The club managed to achieve the bronze medal for the first time in African history by defeating Club América 2–1 in Yokohama. Mohamed Aboutrika scoring the two goals, while Salvador Cabañas scored the only goal for the Mexican club.

Al Ahly played the 2007 CAF Super Cup on 18 February at the Addis Ababa Stadium as the champion of the 2006 CAF Champions League against the ES Sahel, the champion of the 2006 CAF Confederation Cup. Al Ahly suffered from many absentees at this stage due to injuries. However, the match went to penalties after the extra time ended with a goalless draw, which Al Ahly won 5–4 on shootout. After achieving the Super Cup title, the club equalled the record set by Zamalek with 3 Super Cup titles, before adding three other titles to set a new record. Al Ahly also set another record as the club with most participations in the African Super Cup (8 times).

The Red Giants continued dominating the league title, winning the Egyptian Premier League for the 4th consecutive time by 17 points away from Ismaily SC. The team also won the Super Cup for the fourth time in a row by beating Zamalek 2–0 with goals by Ahmed Hassan and Moataz Eno. It was the second victory in a week for Ahly over Zamalek after their meeting in the CAF Champions League a week earlier. Al Ahly won the CAF Champions league for the sixth time with a 4–2 win on aggregate over Coton Sport FC de Garoua in the final, after finishing the first leg with a 2–0 win and drawing in the second leg 2–2. The club set off for the Club World Cup again, but this time with two defeats from C.F. Pachuca and Adelaide Football Club.

The club started the 2008–09 season winning the CAF Super Cup after defeating CS Sfaxien 2–1 with two goals scored by Flávio, and before starting the race to the league's shield with Ismaily. The two teams played a playoff match to determine the champion, which Al Ahly won 1–0 by Flavio's header from a free kick delivered by his compatriot Gilberto.
It was the last championship for Manuel José during his second term before handing over the team's leadership to Hossam El-Badry. El Badry managed to keep the 2009–10 league shield in Al Ahly's cupboard to become the first national coach to win the league championship for the club in 23 years. Al Ahly won the Egyptian Super Cup by defeating Haras El Hodoud SC 1–0.

In the CAF Champions League, Al Ahly qualified for the semi-finals, but was knocked out by Espérance Sportive de Tunis due to a famous refereeing mistake by Joseph Lamptey that gave the hosts a win in the second leg with a clear handball in the goal scored by Michael Eneramo.

The sports activity in Egypt was postponed because of the Port Said Stadium riot, which resulted in the deaths of 74 people including 72 Al Ahly fans and caused the injuries of more than 500 people. In the first match after the return of sports activity, Al Ahly won the Egyptian Super Cup after defeating Enppi 2–1, in a mourn-driven match at the empty stadium of Borg El Arab Stadium. Despite the difficult events, Al Ahly players overcame the circumstances and defeated Esperance in the 2012 CAF Champions League Final. The first leg finished 1–1 at the Borg El Arab Stadium. A 2-1 second leg victory to Al Ahly at the Stade Olympique de Radès added the seventh African champions title in the history of the club, with Gedo scoring Ahly's opener from a shot inside the 18 yard box before  half-time, and Walid Soliman making it 2–0 in the 61st minute. Esperance's striker Yannick N'Djeng pulled a goal back, and Mohamed Aboutrika missed a penalty, but Al Ahly held on to win the match.

Al Ahly, led by Hossam El Badri, achieved fourth place in the 2012 FIFA Club World Cup in Japan, with a victory in the first match against Sanfrecce Hiroshima 2–1, with goals by El Sayed Hamdy and Ahly's talismanic midfielder Mohamed Aboutrika who came off the bench to score the winning goal after 12 minutes into the second half.
Al Ahly then lost 1–0 to the Copa Libertadores champion Corinthians, and then defeated by Monterrey in the third-place deciding match.

Hossam El Badri left the team to Mohamed Youssef, who managed to complete the march successfully and lead Ahly to the 2013 CAF Champions League title for the eighth time by beating the South African club Orlando Pirates 2–0 in the second leg match, after a 1–1 draw in the first leg. Mohamed Aboutrika scored for Al Ahly in the first leg from a freekick. The second leg match was the last impression of the fans of club legend Mohamed Aboutrika when he scored the first goal of the match to be the last goal of his journey in the red shirt.

Mahmoud Taher Era (2014–2017)
Al Ahly made their way to the African Confederations Cup after an early exit from the Champions League, but the Red Giants had a new strong motivation in adding this continental tournament to the club's cupboard for the first time. Al Ahly reached the final against Séwé FC but lost the first leg 2–1. In the return match, the score was 0–0 until the sixth minute of stoppage time, when Al Ahly's Emad Moteab grabbed the goal of the coronation with a header in the dying minutes, that made coach Juan Carlos Garrido running with celebration on the pitch. Garrido was later sacked after the club was eliminated from the CAF Champions League on penalties to Moghreb Tétouan but, he was still able to make Al Ahly win its first Confederation Cup at the first try.

Al Ahly went through a critical phase after most of the stars of the older generation retired, resulting in losses in a number of tournaments. The team regained balance when they met Zamalek in the Super Cup held in Dubai for the first time at the end of 2015.

Abdul-Aziz Abdul-Shafi led the Red Giants as a coach to a 3–2 win over Zamalek at the Hazza Bin Zayed Stadium to add the ninth Egyptian Super Cup in the club's history.

After missing on the 2014-2015 Egyptian League title, Al Ahly won the 2015-16 league with a seven-point difference between the defending champions Zamalek. Al Ahly finished the competition with the strongest attack and defense under the leadership of Dutchman Martin Jol, who replaced the Portuguese coach Jose Peseiro.
Al Ahly won the league title for the 39th time in the club's history before the end of the league with four rounds. The team managed to go 39th games in a row unbeaten in all competitions, setting a record of 30 games unbeaten in the league, however Al Ahly reached the final of the 2016 Egypt Cup but lost to rival Zamalek SC in a 3–1 defeat hence Al Ahly failed to secure the 36th Egypt Cup for its cabinet. Under the leadership of Hossam El-Badry, Al Ahly was able to keep a clean sheet in 30 games that season in all competitions.

The club then won the Egyptian Cup for the 36th time in its history after beating Al Masry 2–1 in a strong match at the Egyptian Cup final at Borg El Arab Stadium. Al Masry scored in the 102nd minute before Amr Gamal equalized in the 117th minute, and Ahmed Fathy added the winning goal in the 120th minute.

Al Ahly reached the Final of the 2017 CAF Champions League, drawing 1–1 with Wydad AC at Borg El Arab Stadium, Wydad later hosted Al Ahly at Stade Mohamed V, Casablanca, when Al Ahly was defeated 1-0 and failed to secure the 9th CAF Champions League trophy.

Mahmoud El Khatib Era & Return to African Triumph (2017–Present)
On 1 December 2017, Mahmoud El Khatib was elected as the new club president. El Khatib won the polls ahead of Mahmoud Taher with 20,956 votes. Taher, who had been president since 2014 until 2017, collected 13,182 votes. In the race of vice-presidency, Mustafa Fahmy collected 14,269 votes compared to former Egyptian sports minister El Amry Farouk who won with 19,923 votes.

Al Ahly won the Egyptian Super Cup title for the tenth time in its history, after defeating Al Masry SC 1–0, in the match that was held on 12 January 2019 at the Hazza bin Zayed Stadium Al Ain, United Arab Emirates.
The winning goal was scored by Walid Azaro in the 12th minute of the first extra half of the match, which gave the Red Devils the title, this also made Walid the first Moroccan and foreigner to score in the tournament.

The next season, the club managed to clinch the Egyptian Premier League for the third consecutive season under the leadership of the manager Hossam El-Badry, and fortieth in its history, reaching the fourth star. Al Ahly officially won the title 6 weeks before the end of the championship, achieving the second fastest league in its history after the historic 2004–05 Egyptian Premier League season.

Al Ahly reached the 2018 CAF Champions League Final, but lost to Tunisian club Esperance Du Tunis. Al Ahly won in the first leg 3–1, but Esperance Du Tunis defeated Al Ahly 3–0 in the second leg, making them win the CAF Champions League Final hence, Al Ahly failed to secure the 9th CAF Champions League title.

On 9 April 2019, Al Ahly was knocked off the 2018-19 CAF Champions League after suffering a 5-0 humiliating loss to South Africa’s Mameloudi Sundowns. In the return match, Al Ahly won 1-0 but the score on aggregate was 5-1. This loss which was a catastrophe for the club’s history and was the club’s biggest loss since 1942 and in the CAF Champions League tournament. This loss resulted in the club’s board deducting 10% of the players salary for a year. Many even criticized Martin Lasarte saying he was mostly responsible for the loss.

Al Ahly managed to win the 2018–19 Egyptian Premier League title for the fourth consecutive season and for the 41st in its history under the leadership of the Uruguayan manager Martín Lasarte, after defeating Al Mokawloon Al Arab 3–1 in a meeting that gathered the two on 24 July 2019 at the Borg El Arab Stadium. This result put Ahly five points clear of their rivals Zamalek with one game of the league season left.
Al Ahly won the 2018-19 League title despite an extremely difficult path and Al Ahly was in the 18th position (last position of the Egyptian Premier League). Results eventually improved and winter signings that included: Hussein El Shahat, Hamdi Fathi, Mahmoud Wahid, Ramadan Sobhi, Mohamed Mahmoud, Yasser Ebrahim and Geraldo helped improve results which led Al Ahly to the 2018-19 league title. The 2018–19 league win raised the club trophies to 136, making Al Ahly the most crowned club in world football with 20 continental titles; nine Champions Leagues, one Confederation Cup, four Cup Winners' Cups, six Super Cups and one Afro-Asian Club Championship. As of 2019, Al Ahly has won CAF Champions League in 1982, 1987, 2001, 2005, 2006, 2008, 2012 and in 2013; making them the most crowned team in Africa. At the national level, Al Ahly achieved 41 Egyptian Premier League and 36 Egypt Cup, 11 Egyptian Super Cup title, and seven Sultan Hussein Cup, 16 Cairo League more than any other club, along with winning the cup of the United Arab Republic on one occasion and the cup of the Egyptian Confederation Cup once.

On 31 August, Rene Weiler was named the new coach of Al Ahly. Weiler replaced Martin Lasarte who was sacked despite guiding Ahly to win the league title with a game to spare. Weiler was able to win his first title with the club in less than one month as Al Ahly managed to win the Egyptian Super Cup for the 11th time in the club history after defeating Zamalek 3–2 on 20 September 2019 at the Borg El Arab Stadium. The Nigerian striker Junior Ajayi scored the first and third goals for Al Ahly, to become only the second foreigner to score in the history of the Egyptian Super Cup, with the first foreign player to score in the tournament being Moroccan striker Walid Azaro who scored the winning goal against Al Masry in the 2017–18 Egyptian Super Cup. Ajayi became the first Nigerian and foreign player to score two goals in the Egyptian Super Cup.

On 18 September, after Zamalek's loss to Aswan SC, Al Ahly won their 42nd Egyptian Premier League title in the 2019–20 season; this was the 13th league title the club won from 14 possible since 2004, and was the second title for Weiler before leaving the club and being replaced by Pitso Mosimane, the first South African manager in the history Al Ahly.

Continental dominance (2020–) 
On 27 November, Al Ahly faced local rival Zamalek in the 2020 CAF Champions League Final, winning 2–1 with El Solia opening the score for Al Ahly in the 5th minute with a header. Shikabala then equalized for Zamalek in the 31st minute with a left-footed shot on the edge of the penalty area to the top left corner of the net past El Shenawy.
Magdy got the winning goal for Al Ahly in the 86th minute; controlling the ball on his knee outside the penalty area after a clearance, before volleying to the right corner of the net and  past Gabaski, to clinch Al Ahly's ninth CAF Champions League title and their first since 2013. This match is also known as the African Game of the Century, as the two giants of Africa faced off each other for the CAF Champions League trophy.
 About a week later, Al Ahly defeated Tala'ea El Gaish SC in the Egypt Cup Final 3–2 on penalties. With this Victory, Al Ahly won the treble for the third time in their history, and becoming the first African team to complete the continental treble three times.

Qualified for the 2020 FIFA Club World Cup, Al Ahly defeated hosts Al Duhail in the first match of the tournament, thanks to a strike from Hussein El Shahat, sending Al Ahly to its first official match with the European champions Bayern Munich in the Semi-finals. Bayern defeated Al Ahly 2–0 with a brace scored by Robert Lewandowski. Al Ahly managed to secure the bronze medal for the second time in the club's history after defeating Palmeiras, the winners of the 2020 Copa Libertadores in the Third place play off, becoming the first and only Arab or African team to have won two medals in the tournament.

On 28 May 2021, Al Ahly beat RS Berkane 2–0 in the 2021 CAF Super Cup in Qatar, clinching their 22nd continental title. On 17 July 2021, Al Ahly defeated Kaizer Chiefs 3–0 in the Champions League Final in Morocco, winning their tenth Champions League and twenty third continental title.

On 21 September 2021, Al Ahly lost the Egyptian Super Cup to Tala'ea El Gaish in a 3–2 defeat on penalties, this resulted in a disciplinary action by the club's board, deducting £E300,000  from the players, football director, and the entirety of the coaching staff salaries. The deduction was later lifted after Al Ahly beat Zamalek 5–3 in the Cairo derby on 5 November 2021.

On 22 December 2021, Al Ahly achieved its 8th CAF Super Cup after beating Raja CA 6–5 on penalties. Raja scored the first goal in the 13th minute after Yasser Ibrahim scored an own goal but, Taher Mohamed Taher equalized for Al Ahly on the 90th minute, taking the match to penalty shootouts.

Al Ahly qualified to the 2021 FIFA Club World Cup in the United Arab Emirates as the champions of Africa. The club won the first match 1–0 against the CONCACAF Champions League winners Monterrey of Mexico despite having many players missing due to injuries, and that some of the club's players were participating with the Egyptian national football team in the 2021 Africa Cup of Nations. Mohamed Hany scored the only goal of the match in the 53rd minute. In the Semi-final, Al Ahly lost against Palmeiras, the Winners of the 2021 Copa Libertadores 2–0 to play against Saudi Side Al Hilal in the Third place playoff. Al Ahly achieved the 3rd place in the FIFA Club World Cup for the 3rd time in the club's history after defeating Al Hilal 4–0, the biggest victory for Al Ahly in the Club World Cup.

Al Ahly for the second time reached the CAF Champions League Final for the third time in a row under the management of Pitso Mosimane (the first time was under the management of Portuguese former manager Manuel José), after defeating Algerian side ES Sétif 6–2 on aggregate, but failed to secure the 11th CAF Champions League trophy after losing 2–0 to Wydad AC, this would be seen as unfair since the match was played at Wydad's home stadium (Stade Mohamed V), and the match should have been played at a neutral stadium. Al Ahly players were unwilling to wear the silver medal and went as far by throwing their silver medal on the ground, Al Ahly's manager, Pitso Mosimane, threw it as well and said that he doesn't play for silver.

On 13 June 2022, Mosimane parted ways with Al Ahly and Samy Koumsan took over the manager role as an interim manager. On June 29, 2022, Ricardo Soares replaced Pitso Mosimane as Al Ahly's manager. His debut with Al Ahly was against Petrojet in the Egypt Cup Semi-final in which he led Al Ahly to a 2–0 victory to meet rival Zamalek for the Egypt Cup Final in which Al Ahly lost to its local rival in a 2-1 defeat hence failed to secure its 38th Egypt Cup. This period witnessed a mass deterioration of Al Ahly, losing 3-2 to Smouha and Soares’s league debut was a goalless draw with El Gouna, Al Ahly lost 2-0 to Pyramids in the league, drawing with Mokawloon Al Arab and drawing with Pharco. Due to that, Al Ahly went through a critical phase.
Al Ahly for the first time since the 1991-92 season was not in the top two of the Egyptian Premier League table as the club finished third place.

Following disappointing results during his reign, Ricardo Soares was sacked on August 31, 2022, just 2 months after he was appointed as Al Ahly’s manager. Many people claimed that the dismissal of Soares was unfair because he arrived to Al Ahly during a hard time.
He was replaced by Marcel Koller who was appointed as Al Ahly’s new manager on September 9, 2022. Marcel Koller helped Al Ahly return to winning ways and lifted his first trophy with Al Ahly which was the Egyptian Super Cup when he led Al Ahly  to beating arch-rivals Zamalek SC in a 2-0 win. 

Al Ahly under  Marcel Koller beat Alexandria’s based Smouha SC in a 3-1 win in the Egypt Cup Semi-Final to meet Pyramids FC in the final. A couple of weeks later, Al Ahly played Auckland City for the 2022 FIFA Club World Cup, where Al Ahly beat the New Zealand based team in a 3-0 win to face off CONCACAF Champions League winners Seattle Sounders who were competing as the first MLS club to participate in the tournament and their first ever match. Al Ahly achieved a late 1-0 victory after a shot from Afsha and advanced to the Semi-Final to meet the UEFA Champions League winners and Spanish giants: Real Madrid. This would be the second time the two sides meet after Manuel Jose’s 2001 debut with the club where he was able to beat Real Madrid 1-0 at the Cairo International Stadium. Al Ahly lost to Real Madrid and faced Flamengo for the third place playoffs, when Al Ahly lost 4-2 and ended with the 4th place for the tournament.

Rivalries 

The Cairo Derby is a rival football match between Egyptian clubs Al Ahly SC and Zamalek SC, which are among the most successful clubs in Africa. Al Ahly and Zamalek were named by the Confederation of African Football as the 1st and 2nd African Clubs of the 20th century, respectively. Both clubs are located in Greater Cairo, and their matches are considered the highlight of the football season with a live broadcast to most of the Middle Eastern and North African countries since the 1970s. Typically, the derby is played twice each season with two matches in the Egyptian Premier League, but it is not uncommon to find the teams meeting each other in the Egypt Cup, especially in the final, and in Africa's most prestigious club competition, the CAF Champions League.

Supporters

Ultras Ahlawy

Al Ahly has a large fan base of ultras named Ultras Ahlawy (abbreviated UA07) which are known for their pyrotechnic displays. Ultras Ahlawy raised its banner for the first time at a match against ENPPI Club on 13 April 2007. Ultras Ahlawy also supports Al Ahly's basketball, volleyball, and handball teams. Ultras Ahlawy members include college graduates, workers, and youth from many social levels in Egypt. Their motto is "Together Forever", which is meant to highlight the connection between their members. Other slogans include "WE ARE EGYPT", "The best club in the universe" or "The best club in existence" (Egyptian pronunciation: A'zam Nady Fi El Koon).

Clubs in Egypt became a major political force during the 2011 Egyptian revolution against former president Mubarak, but were known for long-standing animosity with the police. When 38 members of the Ultras Devils were arrested in Shebeen al-Kom for "belonging to an illegal group", along with additional violent offences, it was seen as a crackdown on the organizations by authorities.

Other Supporting groups

Port Said Stadium riot 

On 1 February 2012, a massive riot occurred at Port Said Stadium in Port Said, Egypt, following an Egyptian Premier League football match between Al-Masry and Al Ahly, following a 3–1 victory by Al-Masry. Al-Masry supporters violently attacked supporters of Al Ahly by trapping them inside the stadium and attacking them with clubs, stones, bottles, and fireworks. As a result, 72 supporters of Al Ahly were killed with more than 500 injured after thousands of Al-Masry spectators stormed the stadium stands and pitch. Many of the deaths were due to the police's refusal to open the stadium gates. Members of Ultras Ahlawy claim that the supporters were specifically targeted because of their highly televised calls for the Supreme Council of the Armed Forces to step down, as well as their open mockery of the previous regime and the Supreme Council of the Armed Forces.

Anthem
"Arise, Al Ahly" is the club's official anthem written by the journalist Fekry Abaza in 1957 and composed by Umm Kulthum's husband Mahmoud Sherif. It was influenced by the anthem of the Egyptian Revolution of 1919 "Arise Egyptian". The lyrics of the anthem are as follows:
                        Arise, Al Ahly, see your sons and the soldiers        see your Battalions, see your soldiers and the crowds
                        See the signs of victory through all the generations      see and record the glories of immortality in them
                                               You are always you are always always on the top
                        Every blessing in your life is with us                      and that is the will of our Lord
                        From your elders we gained our glory                     and with your youth we kept our name
                                               You are always you are always always on the top

Name origin 
Amin Sami Pasha was the first person to propose the name of "Al Ahly Sporting Club". Al Ahly, which means "The National", was named as such because it was created to serve the students and graduates of the high schools who were the mainstay of the revolution against the British occupation of Egypt.

Grounds

Mokhtar El-Tetsh Stadium (training ground) 

Football was not one of the goals of the club's founders. The club was originally founded for students of higher schools to meet and practice political dialogues. However, the club, which prompted Al Ahly to build its first stadium in 1909 and they used to call it at the time (Al-Hawsh), which is a colloquial word from the Egyptian dialect meaning “the courtyard” in Arabic. The stadium was developed over the years to become known as Mokhtar El-Tetsh Stadium. In 1929, the stadium was named after Egypt's prince at this time, the Prince Farouk Stadium. By 1956, light stands were added to the stadium. The stadium was later renamed to the Mokhtar El-Tetsh Stadium, after Mokhtar El-Tetsh, a legend of the club. Al Ahly continued to play their home games at Mokhtar El-Tetsh Stadium until the Cairo International Stadium was opened. Currently the stadium hold the team training and friendly games.

Cairo International Stadium
Al Ahly formerly played their home games at their own ground, Mokhtar El Tetsh Stadium, but its capacity was far too small for the club's supporters. As a consequence, Mokhtar El Tetsh Stadium became the official training ground, and Cairo International Stadium replaced it as the official home ground. Since 2014, Al Ahly stopped playing their home games at the Cairo International Stadium for an indefinite period due to security reasons. In the 2016–17 season, Al Ahly played most of their home games at Al Salam Stadium and played their matches in the African competitions at Borg El Arab Stadium. At the first leg of the Egyptian Premier League 2017–18 season, Al Ahly returned to Cairo International Stadium as its official home ground.

Al Ahly WE Al Salam Stadium

On 4 December 2019 Al Ahly Announced that they bought Al Salam Stadium as usufruct for 25 years or until Al Ahly SC Stadium is built and important matches that needs larger capacity will be played on Cairo Stadium, the stadium was later renamed to Al Ahly Stadium.

The first match hosted by the stadium was on 6 December against Al-Hilal Club at the 2019–20 CAF Champions League group stage.

Despite acquiring the stadium, Al Ahly confirmed that El Entag El Harby, a club owned by the Egyptian Ministry of Military Production that used to play their home matches there, would be allowed to play at the stadium normally until the end of the 2019–20 season to avoid any possible problems or conflicts in the league's schedule, with the option to extend it for further seasons. Al Ahly also confirmed that all national teams would be allowed to play on the venue.

Al Ahly SC Stadium
In November 2022, Al Ahly entered into an agreement with Emirati company Poplous which had built football stadiums such as Arsenal's Emirates Stadium and London's famous Wembley Stadium to construct a new stadium for the club.

It was announced that the stadium will be established on an area about 46,000 meters, and it would hold about 50,000 fans, making it the 3rd largest stadium in Egypt after Borg El Arab Stadium and Cairo International Stadium. It will have a sporting complex around the stadium that will include a squash complex with 8 courts, a gymnastics and a karate hall, as well as training grounds for football. It is expected construction will be completed within 5 years in Sheikh Zayed City.

Media 
Al Ahly TV is an Egyptian-Arab channel that currently broadcasts the football team's friendly matches, youth team matches and other sports matches. The channel was established in 2008, in cooperation with Arab Radio and Television Network. The official broadcast of the channel was launched on 3 December 2010 when former club president Hassan Hamdy announced the opening of the channel.

The club also has a YouTube channel that has over 1.86 million  subscribers as of May 2022. Training videos, exclusive features, and match highlights are frequently published on the channel. On 22 January 2021, the club's channel on YouTube released a documentary called Secret of the 9th, it reached one million views in less than one day.

In addition, the club has its own weekly magazine which covers the club's various news.

Kits and crest 

On 3 November 1917, Mohamed Sherif Sabri Bek (who was the uncle of King Farouk I) became a member of the club and designed the first logo of Al Ahly (10 years after the foundation of the club), it was inspired by the Egyptian flag (which was red and white at the time) and had a crown that represented Egypt's royal rule. In 1952, following the July Revolution and changing the ruling method of Egypt to presidency, the crown was removed. The logo remained unchanged until 2007, when it had slight changes celebrating the club's centenary. In late 2018, a 4th star was added on the top of the badge after Al Ahly's 40th league title. Al Ahly's crest was voted "the most beautiful in the game" in a 2020 poll by Spanish newspaper Marca.

Kit suppliers & shirt sponsors

Honours

Domestic (115 titles)

Africa (23 titles)

Regional (4 titles)

Worldwide (1 titles) 

 
  shared record

Awards & recognitions
 CAF Club of the 20th Century: 2001
 Globe soccer Top Titles Winners in the Middle East: 2020

Seasons

Recent Seasons

Domestic competitions

CAF overall ranking of African clubs

CAF 5-Year Ranking 

The club rankings for this season's CAF Champions League and CAF Confederation Cup based on results from each CAF club competition from 2018 to the 2021–22 season.

Players

Current squad

Youth Academy

Other players under contract

Out on loan

Coaching staff

Board of directors 

Source:

Club Figures

Presidents

Captains 
Throughout its history, Al Ahly has had 48 club captains, the first captain was Ahmed Fouad Anwar.Mohamed El-Shenawy is the current captain since 2020.

Notes 

Al-Ahly numbers in the Club World Cup:
Al-Ahly of Egypt is the Arab team most participating in the tournament with seven editions, the first of which was in 2005 and the latest version, Al-Ahly's match against Monterrey became the 16th match for the African champion in the Club World Cup, becoming the most participating team in the world in this tournament.

See also 
 Al Ahly Basketball
 Al Ahly Handball
 Al Ahly Volleyball

References

External links 

 

 
Football clubs in Egypt
Football clubs in Cairo
Association football clubs established in 1907
1907 establishments in Egypt
Sports clubs in Egypt
Clubs and societies in Egypt
CAF Champions League winning clubs
CAF Confederation Cup winning clubs
African Cup Winners Cup winning clubs
CAF Super Cup winning clubs